3596 Meriones  is a large Jupiter trojan from the Greek camp, approximately  in diameter. It was discovered on 14 November 1985, by Danish astronomers Poul Jensen and Karl Augustesen at the Brorfelde Observatory near Holbæk, Denmark. The assumed C-type asteroid belongs to the 50 largest Jupiter trojans and has a rotation period of 12.96 hours. It was named after the Cretan leader Meriones from Greek mythology.

Orbit and classification 

Meriones is a dark Jovian asteroid orbiting in the leading Greek camp at Jupiter's  Lagrangian point, 60° ahead of its orbit in a 1:1 resonance (see Trojans in astronomy). It is also a non-family asteroid in the Jovian background population.

It orbits the Sun at a distance of 4.8–5.5 AU once every 11 years and 9 months (4,293 days; semi-major axis of 5.17 AU). Its orbit has an eccentricity of 0.07 and an inclination of 24° with respect to the ecliptic. The body's observation arc begins with a precovery taken at Uccle Observatory in October 1950, or 35 years prior to its official discovery observation at Brorfelde.

Naming 

This minor planet was named from Greek mythology after Meriones, who co-commanded together with the Greek hero Idomeneus the Cretan contingent in the Trojan War, where they slew many Trojans, especially in the Battle of the Ships.

The official naming citation was published by the Minor Planet Center on 7 September 1987.

Physical characteristics 

Meriones is an assumed, carbonaceous C-type asteroid.

Rotation period 

In 1991, a rotational lightcurve of Meriones was published by German and Italian astronomers. Lightcurve analysis of the photometric observations gave a rotation period of 12.96 hours with a brightness amplitude of 0.15 magnitude.

Diameter and albedo 

According to the surveys carried out by the Japanese Akari satellite and the NEOWISE mission of NASA's Wide-field Infrared Survey Explorer, Meriones measures 73.28 and 87.38 kilometers in diameter and its surface has an albedo of 0.064 and 0.048, respectively. The Collaborative Asteroid Lightcurve Link assumes a standard albedo for a carbonaceous asteroid of 0.057, and derives a diameter of 75.09 kilometers based on an absolute magnitude of 9.35.

References

External links 
 Asteroid Lightcurve Database (LCDB), query form (info )
 Dictionary of Minor Planet Names, Google books
 Discovery Circumstances: Numbered Minor Planets (1)-(5000) – Minor Planet Center
 Asteroid 3596 Meriones at the Small Bodies Data Ferret
 
 

003596
Discoveries by Poul Jensen (astronomer)
Discoveries by Karl Augustesen
Named minor planets
19851114